Zhou Suhong (born 23 April 1979 in Changzing, Huzhou, Zhejiang) is a Chinese volleyball player, who was a member of the Chinese women's national team that won the gold medal at both the World Cup and the Athens Olympic Games. She is an opposite hitter. She is married to former Chinese men's national volleyball team member Tang Miao. She wears uniform number 7. Her hobbies include music and reading and Zhou is currently studying at Zhejiang University.

Career
Zhou won the 2001 World Grand Champion Cup, the 2003 World Grand Prix, the 2003 World Cup and the 2004 Athens Olympic Games gold medal.

Clubs
 Zhejiang New Century Tourism (1996–2009)
 Guangdong Evergrande (2009–2010)
 Zhejiang New Century Tourism (2010-2013)

Individual awards
 2003 World Cup "Best Receiver"
 2004-2005 Chinese League "Most Valuable Player"
 2004-2005 Chinese League "Best Receiver"
 2005 Asian Women's Volleyball Championship "Best Receiver"
 2005 FIVB Women's World Grand Champions Cup "Best Receiver"
 2005 FIVB Women's World Grand Champions Cup "Best Spiker"
 2005 FIVB World Grand Prix "Best Receiver"
 2008 Summer Olympics "Best Receiver"

References

External links
 southcn.com

Olympic bronze medalists for China
Olympic gold medalists for China
Olympic volleyball players of China
People from Huzhou
Volleyball players at the 2004 Summer Olympics
Volleyball players at the 2008 Summer Olympics
Zhejiang University alumni
Living people
1979 births
Olympic medalists in volleyball
Volleyball players from Zhejiang
Medalists at the 2008 Summer Olympics
Medalists at the 2004 Summer Olympics
Asian Games medalists in volleyball
Volleyball players at the 2002 Asian Games
Volleyball players at the 2006 Asian Games
Volleyball players at the 2010 Asian Games
Chinese women's volleyball players
Asian Games gold medalists for China
Medalists at the 2002 Asian Games
Medalists at the 2006 Asian Games
Medalists at the 2010 Asian Games
Opposite hitters
21st-century Chinese women